2017 in the Philippines details events of note that happened in the Philippines in 2017.

2017 was designated as Visit ASEAN Year 2017.

Incumbents

 
 President: Rodrigo Duterte (PDP–Laban)
 Vice President: Leni Robredo (Liberal)
 Congress (17th):
 Senate President: Aquilino Pimentel III (PDP–Laban)
 House Speaker: Pantaleon Alvarez (PDP–Laban)
 Chief Justice: Maria Lourdes Sereno

Events

January
 January 1 – Four members of the Bangsamoro Islamic Freedom Fighters are killed and four others were wounded in a clash with government soldiers that lasted 10 hours in Datu Salibo, Maguindanao.
 January 4 – About a hundred armed men, whose affiliation is undetermined, launch an attack on a prison in Kidapawan which had freed at least 158 inmates. The jailbreak resulting from the attack was reportedly the biggest in the history of North Cotabato.
 January 5 – Mohammad Jaafar Maguid, the leader of the Ansar Al-Khilafah Philippines who is allegedly affiliated with the Islamic State, is killed by government security forces in Sarangani.
 January 11: 
 President Duterte signs an executive order mandating universal access to modern family planning tools.
 President Rodrigo Duterte orders the unwarranted arrest and deportation of Indian nationals, especially Punjabis, involved in the 5–6 money lending scheme.
 January 16–20 – The 4th World Apostolic Congress on Mercy commences with a Mass at the Manila Cathedral. Other events were held in Manila, Batangas, Bulacan, and Bataan.
 January 17:
 The city government of Cagayan de Oro declares a state of calamity in response to flooding caused by heavy rainfall brought by a low pressure area in the vicinity of Kabasalan, Zamboanga Sibugay and the tail-end of a cold front.
 The National Bureau of Investigation confirms the death of Jee Ick-Joo, a South Korean entrepreneur who was abducted in Angeles City on October 18, 2016.
 January 30 – Rodrigo Duterte orders the cleansing of the Philippine National Police (PNP) after corruption was discovered in the wake of the kidnapping of Jee Ick-Joo.

February
 February 1 – The Communist Party of the Philippines (CPP) and the New People's Army (NPA) end their unilateral ceasefire with the Philippine government.
 February 10 – A 6.7 magnitude earthquake hits Surigao del Norte, killing at least 4 people.
 February 14: 
 The Philippine National Police declares a "war on illegal gambling", following the withdrawal of the police on the War on Drugs.
 Department of Environment and Natural Resources secretary Gina Lopez orders the closure of 75 mines for violations of environmental laws.
 February 21 – A tour bus carrying college students bound for a camping site in Tanay, Rizal, lost brakes and crashed into a roadside electricity pole, killing 15 and injuring 40 on board. The accident uncovered lax regulations on safety of students on educational trips in the Philippines and prompted the Commission on Higher Education (CHED) and Department of Education (DepEd) to issue moratoriums on field trips for the 2016–17 school year.
 February 24 – Senator Leila de Lima is arrested for alleged violations of Republic Act 9165, or the Comprehensive Dangerous Drugs Act of 2002, related to her alleged involvement in the New Bilibid Prison drug trafficking scandal.
 February 27 – Jeepney drivers, mostly belonging to the transport groups, PISTON and Stop and Go Coalition, lead a nationwide strike against the planned modernization of jeepneys, that caused suspension of classes and stranding passengers at major metropolitan areas nationwide.
 February 28 – President Rodrigo Duterte signs the Paris Agreement on Climate Change.

March
 March 1 – After a temporary suspension of the Philippine war on drugs due to the kidnapping and killing of a Jee Ick-Joo, Philippine president Rodrigo Duterte orders the Philippine National Police to resume his controversial campaign.
 March 2 – Angel Manalo, brother of Iglesia ni Cristo (INC) Executive Minister Eduardo Manalo, and 31 others are arrested for illegal possession of firearms for the alleged shooting incident at Manalo's compound in Quezon City.
 March 9 – Members of Kadamay (Kalipunan ng Damayan Mahihirap) occupy 4,000 houses inside government housing projects in Pandi and San Jose del Monte in Bulacan.
 March 15 – Magdalo representative Gary Alejano files the first impeachment complaint against Rodrigo Duterte alleging culpability in the extrajudicial killings in the Philippine war on drugs.

April
 April 4:
 Rodrigo Duterte orders the resignation of Department of the Interior and Local Government secretary Ismael Sueño amid corruption allegations.
 A magnitude 5.5 earthquake occurs northwest of Tingloy, hit Batangas, causing damage to buildings. The province soon declared a state of calamity after the quake.
 April 11 – A clash between the Armed Forces of the Philippines, Philippine National Police Special Action Force and Abu Sayyaf in Inabanga, Bohol kills 6, including the notorious Muammar Askali, also known as "Abu Rami".
 April 17 – A bus traveling from Isabela into Ilocos region fallss off a ravine in Carranglan, Nueva Ecija, killing 31 on board. The accident, resulting from poor vehicle maintenance, is one of the most deadliest road accidents in the Philippines.
 April 26–29 – The 30th ASEAN Summit is held at the Philippine International Convention Center in Pasay.
 April 27 – The Philippine National Police discovers a secret jail cell inside a Manila Police District precinct, that raised possibilities of police abuses in Rodrigo Duterte's campaign against illegal drugs.
 April 28 – The bombings were a series of blasts take place in the district of Quiapo in Manila.

May
 May 5 – United Nations special rapporteur Agnes Callamard takes part in a drug policy forum in the University of the Philippines. The Philippine government said it would file a complaint with the UN regarding the visit.
 May 6 – Just one week since the first blast, twin bombings take place about two and a half hours apart in the same district in Quiapo, Manila.
 May 15 – The majority of the House of Representatives justice committee rejects the impeachment complaint filed by Magdalo representative Gary Alejano against Rodrigo Duterte for lack of substance.
 May 16:
 President Rodrigo Duterte signs Executive Order No. 25, that renamed Benham Rise to Philippine Rise.
 President Rodrigo Duterte signs Executive Order No. 26, that ordered a nationwide smoking ban.
 May 18: 
 Implementation of Republic Act No. 10913, or the "Anti-Distracted Driving Act", is started.
 Ferdinand Marcelino, along with his Chinese informant, Yan Yi Shou, are released after their drug-related case was dropped.
 May 19 – Implementation of Republic Act No. 10666, or the "Children on Motorcycle Safety Act of 2015", is started.
 May 23 – President Rodrigo Duterte signs Proclamation No. 216 declaring a 60-day martial law in Mindanao following clashes between government forces and the Maute group in Marawi.

June
 June 1 – Philippine Defense Secretary Delfin Lorenzana announces the deaths of ten soldiers in Marawi as a result of a "friendly fire" airstrike.
 June 2 – A gunman attacks Resorts World Manila in Pasay around midnight, caused a major panic within the complex. Around 38 people died due to smoke inhalation from the fire while injuring 70 people.
 June 4: 
 In Marawi, a ceasefire organised by Moro separatists is broken, leaving locals hungry for nearly two weeks.
 Philippine police identifies the attacker at Resorts World Manila as Jessie Javier Carlos, an ex-employee of the Department of Finance who was deeply in debt.

July
 July 6: 
 A 6.5 magnitude earthquake hits Leyte, causing at least 4 deaths and 100 injuries. The quake also caused power interruptions in the whole of Eastern Visayas and nearby Bohol.
 The Supreme Court says President Rodrigo Duterte can declare martial law in the whole Philippines. Two days prior, the Supreme Court had ruled in favor of the constitutionality of Proclamation No. 216 which declared Martial Law and suspended the privilege of the writ of habeas corpus in the whole of Mindanao, in response to the Marawi crisis.
 July 22 – In a special joint session requested by President Rodrigo Duterte, the Congress of the Philippines votes 261–18 to extend the martial law in Mindanao until December 31, 2017.
 July 23 – The nationwide ban on public smoking is implemented.
 July 30 – Sixteen people, including Mayor Reynaldo Parojinog Sr. and his wife, are killed in a police drug raid in Ozamiz, Misamis Occidental. The Parojinog family had been previously identified with their ties to the illegal drug trade, as well as the organized crime group Kuratong Baleleng.

August
 August 8 – The Supreme Court of the Philippines junks all petitions against the burial of former President of the Philippines Ferdinand Marcos at the Libingan ng mga Bayani, re-affirming its earlier ruling on November 8, 2016.
 August 9 – President Rodrigo Duterte abolishes the Negros Island Region (first created in 2015 by his predecessor) through Executive Order no. 38, citing lack of funds to fully establish the region. Negros Occidental reverts to the Western Visayas region, Negros Oriental back to the Central Visayas region.
 August 11 – The Department of Agriculture confirms an avian influenza outbreak in the province of Pampanga.
 August 16 – A 17-year-old Kian Loyd delos Santos is fatally shot by police officers conducting an anti-drug operation in Caloocan, Metro Manila. The case became controversial when the official police reports differed from witness accounts and CCTV footage. This would cause a thousands of marchers to protest on EDSA heeding calls from the Philippine Catholic Church to criticize the drug war and the Senate to investigate the killing. Hundreds attend the funeral procession of delos Santos on August 26.
 August 20 – The Court of Appeals of the Philippines junks U.S. Marine Joseph Scott Pemberton's motion for reconsideration, re-affirming its decision last April upholding the 2015 homicide ruling of the Olongapo City Regional Trial Court; citing the defendant's arguments as mere "rehash of issues". The Court of Appeals also upheld the payment of ₱ 4.32 million to Jennifer Laude's family for "loss of earning capacity". Pemberton faces 10 years in prison.

September
 September 7 – The Senate investigates Paolo Duterte, the son of current Philippine President Rodrigo Duterte, in an alleged methamphetamine smuggling scandal.
 September 12 – The House of Representatives approves a bill that limits the budget of the Commission on Human Rights to only ₱1,000 (US$20).
 September 14 – The Makabayan bloc leaves the majority of the Philippine lower House over disagreements due to the ongoing drug crackdown.
 September 15 – Around 1,200 members of the Philippine National Police in Caloocan are fired over allegations of crimes attributed to the police.
 September 21 – Coinciding with the 45th anniversary of the declaration of martial law in 1972 by the late President and dictator Ferdinand Marcos, nationwide protests – also known as "National Day of Protest" — are conducted by various groups against the government's implementation of war on drugs and the ongoing martial law in the whole of Mindanao under the administration of President Rodrigo Duterte.

October
 October 16–17 – Armed group leaders, Isnilon Hapilon of Abu Sayyaf and Omar Maute of Maute Group, leaders of ISIL-linked militants fighting the government in the Battle of Marawi are reportedly killed on October 16 during the operation of rescuing the hostages, according to the statement released by Defense Secretary Delfin Lorenzana. The following day President Rodrigo Duterte declared the liberation of Marawi. While the armed forces says this meant that the conflict is substantially it pointed out that there are still skirmishes.
 October 23 – The Battle of Marawi is declared officially over by the military

November
 November 5 – Dubbed as "Lord, Heal Our Land", led by Lingayen-Dagupan Archbishop Socrates Villegas, about thousands of mourners of extrajudicial killing victims attend a mass held in EDSA shrine.
 November 10–12 – The Philippines hosts the 31st ASEAN Summit Clark Freeport Zone in Angeles, Pampanga.
 November 13–14 – The Philippines hosts the Twelfth East Asia Summit at the Clark Freeport Zone in Angeles, Pampanga.

December
 December 19 – President Rodrigo Duterte signs the Tax Reform for Acceleration and Inclusion Law (TRAIN Law).
 December 21 – A ferry sinks off the coast of Luzon in the Philippines with 251 passengers on board. At least four people are reported to have died. The toll is expected to rise, as many are still missing.
 December 22 – The Philippine Coast Guard reports that 252 passengers and crew have been rescued while five people were killed when a ferry capsized Thursday east of Manila.
 December 23:
More than 200 people are dead in the southern Philippines as a result of floods and mudslides caused by Severe Tropical Storm Vinta.
A fire broke out at NCCC Mall in Davao City at around 9:30 a.m. PST (UTC+8), leaving 38 people trapped (later killed) inside the said mall, mostly employees of the market research firm Survey Sampling International (SSI). The probable cause of the fire was faulty electrical wiring due to malpractice of the renovation of the mall's third floor.
 December 28 – In Mandaluyong, law enforcers mistakenly fire at a Mitsubishi Adventure, which they thought carried suspects in a previous shooting incident, resulting in two people dead and two others injured. As a result, 10 police officers were relieved from the post.

Holidays

On August 18, 2016, the government announced at least 19 Philippine holidays for 2017 as declared by virtue of Proclamation No. 50, series of 2016. Note that in the list, holidays in italics are "special non-working holidays," those in bold are "regular holidays," and those in non-italics and non-bold are "special holidays for schools."

In addition, several other places observe local holidays, such as the foundation of their town. These are also "special days."
 January 1 – New Year's Day
 January 2 – Special non-working holiday (in observance of the New Year's Day celebration)
 January 28 – Chinese New Year
 February 25 – 1986 EDSA Revolution
 April 9 – Araw ng Kagitingan (Day of Valor)
 April 13 – Maundy Thursday
 April 14 – Good Friday
 April 15 – Black Saturday
 May 1 – Labor Day
 June 12 – Independence Day
 June 26  – Eid'l Fitr (Feast of Ramadan)
 August 21 – Ninoy Aquino Day
 August 28 – National Heroes Day
 September 1 – Eid'l Adha (Feast of Sacrifice)
 October 31 – Special non-working holiday
 November 1 – All Saints Day
 November 30 – Bonifacio Day
 December 25 – Christmas Day
 December 30 – Rizal Day
 December 31 – Last day of the year (in observance of New Year's celebrations)

Business and economy
 August 22 – Viacom International Media Networks has announced it will no longer pursue a Nickelodeon underwater theme park and resort in Palawan, Philippines. The project, announced last January, attracted controversy due to criticisms from environmentalist groups who fear the resort might destroy the area's marine ecosystem, home to two UNESCO World Heritage sites.

Health
 August 11 – Cases of H5N6 in poultry farms in Pampanga were detected; this was the first time the avian virus was detected in the country.
 December 1 – The Department of Health (DOH) temporarily suspends a school-based dengue vaccination program after Dengvaxia vaccine maker Sanofi Pasteur made a statement that its product poses higher risks to people without prior dengue infection.

Sports

May
 May 6, Football – The first match of the inaugural season of the Philippines Football League, the country's first nationwide professional football league was played.
 May 12–18, Basketball – Quezon City hosted the 2017 SEABA Championship.

August
 August 1–7,  Boxing – The Asian Junior Boxing Championship was hosted in Puerto Princesa, Palawan.
 August 9–17, Volleyball – Metro Manila hosted the 2017 Asian Women's Volleyball Championship.
 August 19–30 – The Philippines competed at the 29th Southeast Asian Games held in Kuala Lumpur, Malaysia. The Philippines finished the 29th SEA Games in 6th place with a medal haul of 24 Golds, 33 Silvers and 64 Bronze which is the country's worst finish in 18 years. The next edition of the Southeast Asian Games will be hosted by the Philippines in 2019.

October
 October 13 – TV5 Network Inc. re-brands its sporting division to ESPN 5 as part of a partnership with The Walt Disney Company and Hearst Corporation, the co-owners of ESPN Inc.; the re-branding was held to coinciding with the start of the 2017 PBA Governors' Cup Finals. Prior to the TV5-ESPN partnership, the ESPN branding was formerly used by Fox Networks Group Asia before re-branded to Fox Sports Asia in 2014.

Entertainment and culture

January
 January 9:
 President Duterte issues Proclamation No. 124 declaring the month of January as the National Bible Month.
 President Duterte declares Yabing Masalon Dulo, Ambalang Ausalin, and Estelita Tumandan Bantilan, the three female Mindanaoan weavers as National Living Treasures for 2016.
 January 30 – The coronation event of the Miss Universe 2016 pageant takes place at the Mall of Asia Arena in Pasay. It is the third time that the Philippines hosted the event. Iris Mittenaere of France was crowned as Miss Universe 2016.

March
 March 5 – Maymay Entrata of Cagayan de Oro is hailed as the Big Winner of Pinoy Big Brother Lucky Season 7.
 March 11 – Noven Belleza of Victorias, Negros Occidental is hailed as It's Showtime's Tawag ng Tanghalan Grand Champion. 
 March 31 – Michelle Arceo of Mandaluyong is crowned as the first ever Gandang Filipina of Wowowin.

April
 April 30 – Rachel Peters, a Filipino-British model, is crowned as Miss Universe Philippines 2017 during the coronation night of the Binibining Pilipinas 2017 at the Smart Araneta Coliseum in Quezon City.

May
 May 27 – JC Teves, Debbie Then, Kim Cruz and Arturo Daza are named as the four new myx VJs at the end of  MYX VJ Search 2017.
 May 30 – Angela Lehmann from Bicol was declared as the grand winner of Philippines' Next Top Model: High Street competition.

June
 June 4 – Wacky Kiray is crowned as the first Greatest Entertainer of I Can Do That!
 June 28 – Maureen Wroblewitz, representing the Philippines, is declared as the grand winner of Asia's Next Top Model (cycle 5).

July
 July 15 – Karen Ibasco, is crowned as Miss Philippines Earth 2017 during the coronation night at the Mall of Asia Arena, Pasay, Philippines
 July 30 – Jona Soquite of Davao City wins as the first The Voice Teens grand champion.

August
 August 25–27 – The third edition of Asia Pop Comic Convention is held with international stars Ray Fisher, Tyler Hoechlin, Joe Keery, Noah Schnapp, Dacre Montgomery and Sadie Sink serving as guests.

September
 September 3 – Former UAAP Courtside Reporter Laura Victoria Lehmann is crowned as the Miss World Philippines 2017 on the Coronation night held at the Mall of Asia Arena in Pasay. She will represent the Philippines at Miss World 2017 pageant to be held in China.

November
 November 4 – Karen Ibasco, is crowned Miss Earth 2017 held at the Mall of Asia Arena, Pasay.
 November 5 – Wynwyn Marquez is crowned as Reina Hispanoamericana-Filipinas 2017 Held in Santa Cruz, Bolivia.
 November 26 – Miss Philippines Rachel Peters is placed in the Top 10 of the Miss Universe 2017 pageant held in Las Vegas, Nevada, USA.

Deaths
January
 January 1 – Mel Lopez, former Mayor of Manila (1986–92) and Philippine Sports Commission chairman (1993–96) (born 1935)
 January 17 –  Donna Villa, actress, film producer, and wife of Carlo J. Caparas. (born 1960)
 January 30 – Cesar C. Raval, Roman Catholic prelate, Bishop of Bangued (born 1924)

February
 February 6 – Boy Asistio, former Mayor of Caloocan (1980–86, 1988–95) (born 1936)
 February 8 – Mulla Abdullah Warli, Quran translator
 February 9 – Rev. Fr. Erick Santos, preacher of Kerygma TV and former host of Family Rosary Crusade (born 1962)
 February 12 – Herminio Bautista, comedian, director, and former Quezon City councilor (born 1934)
 February 28 – Simeon Datumanong, former congressman of Maguindanao and former cabinet member (born 1935)

March
 March 2 – Cornelia "Angge" Lee, radio and talent manager of ABS-CBN (born 1946)
 March 5 – Roden Araneta, finalist of Clown in a Million, Yes Yes Show mainstay, actor and comedian (born 1961)
 March 20 – Leticia Ramos-Shahani, former senator (born 1929)
 March 23 – Alex Tizon, author and Pulitzer Prize-winning journalist (born 1959)

April
 April 13 – Roberto Aboitiz, Chairman of the Ramon Aboitiz Foundation, Inc. (born 1949)
 April 14 – Mariano Que, founder of Mercury Drug (born 1921)
 April 15 – Alfonso Yuchengco, prominent industrialist, certified public accountant, educator, and diplomat (born 1923)
 April 17 – Wilfredo Cruz, songwriter (born 1947)

May
 May 2 – Romeo Vasquez, actor (born 1939)
 May 24 – Gil Portes, film director (born 1945)
 May 25 – Eva Estrada Kalaw, former senator (born 1920)

June
 June 3 – Carlos "Bobong" Velez, head of Vintage Enterprises (born 1945)
 June 7 – Gisela Bendong-Boniel, Mayor of Bien Unido, Bohol (born 1977)
 June 10:
 Leovino Hidalgo, Mayor of Balete, Batangas
 Malang, artist (born 1928)
 June 17:
 Rodolfo Fontiveros Beltran, Roman Catholic prelate and Vicar Apostolic of Bontoc-Lagawe and Bishop of San Fernando de La Union (born 1948)
 Leopoldo S. Tumulak, Roman Catholic prelate, Bishop of Tagbilaran and Military Ordinary of the Philippines (born 1944)
 June 30 – Jake Tordesillas, screenwriter (born 1948)

July
 July 14 – Nikka Cleofe Alejar, news anchor (born 1975)
 July 21 – Soxie Topacio, film director and LGBT activist (Quezon City Pride Council) (born 1952)
 July 23 – Rocky Batolbatol, mixed martial artist (born 1984)
 July 30 – Reynaldo Parojinog, Mayor of Ozamiz

August
 August 1 – Alfie Lorenzo, talent manager (born 1939)
 August 2 – Bobby Ortega, member of the Baguio City Council (born 1938)
 August 6 – Ramon N. Villegas, curator, essayist, art historian, collector, jeweler and poet (born 1953).
 August 8 – Zeny Zabala, actress (born 1937)
 August 24 – Amelyn Veloso, news anchor. (born 1974)

September
 September 4 – David Consunji, chairman emeritus of DMCI Holdings (born 1921)
 September 16 – Ernie Zarate, veteran actor, architect and author (born 1940)
 September 17:
Cris Bolado, basketball player (Alaska Milkmen) (born 1969)
Horacio Castillo III, UST Law Student called Hazing Victim
 September 23:
 Loreto Carbonell, basketball player (born 1933)
 Ric Manrique Jr., singer (born 1947)
 September 26 – Dominador Aytona, politician, Senator (born 1918)
 September 30 – Joe Taruc, radio broadcaster (born 1947)

October
 October 7 – Washington SyCip, accountant, founder of the Asian Institute of Management and SGV & Company (born 1921)
 October 8 – Henedina Abad, politician, member of the House of Representatives of the Philippines for Batanes (born 1955)
 October 9 – Tony Calvento, veteran journalist (born 1954)
 October 11 – Emmanuel Borlaza, film director (born 1935)
 October 14 – Lourdes Quisumbing, former Secretary of Education, Culture and Sports (born 1921)
 October 15 – Chinggoy Alonzo, actor
 October 16:
 Isnilon Hapilon, Islamist militant (MNLF, Al-Qaeda, Abu Sayyaf) (born 1966)
 Omar Maute, Islamist militant (Maute group).
 October 18 – Ricardo Vidal, Roman Catholic prelate and cardinal, Archbishop of Lipa, Cebu and President of the Catholic Bishops' Conference of the Philippines (born 1931)
 October 21 – Juan de Dios Pueblos, Roman Catholic prelate, Bishop of Kidapawan and Butuan (born 1943)
 October 22:
 Jeffrey Claro, super-flyweight boxer (born 1997)
 Baldo Marro, actor and director (born 1948)

November
 November 4 – Isabel Granada, actress and singer (born 1976)
 November 11 – Franco Hernandez, television personality. (It's Showtime) and singer, (born 1991)
 November 19 – Elias Tolentino, basketball player, (born 1942)
 November 20 – Alex Dacanay, journalist, chess player, bass singer, (born 1946)
 November 26 – Christian Vicente Noel, Roman Catholic prelate, Bishop of Talibon (born 1937)

December
 December 5 – Elenito Galido, Roman Catholic prelate, Bishop of Iligan (born 1954)
 December 7 – Charito Planas, lawyer and former Vice Mayor of Quezon City (born 1930)
 December 8 – Flerida Ruth Pineda-Romero, judge and former Associate Justice of the Supreme Court of the Philippines (born 1929)
 December 21 – Mona Sulaiman, olympic sprinter (born 1942)

See also

 Years in the Philippines
 Timeline of Philippine history

References

 
2017 in Southeast Asia
Philippines
2010s in the Philippines
Years of the 21st century in the Philippines